This is a list of international trips made by Kassym-Jomart Tokayev in his position as the 2nd president of the Republic of Kazakhstan.

International trips as president

Gallery

External links
Official Website

References

Foreign relations of Kazakhstan
Diplomatic visits by heads of state